Gazabad (also Romanized as Gazābād; also known as Gazābād-e Soflá) is a village in Qahan Rural District, Khalajastan District, Qom County, Qom Province, Iran. At the 2006 census, its population was 22, in 6 families.

References 

Populated places in Qom Province